Benthesicymidae is a family of shrimps in the suborder Dendrobranchiata.

References

External links 
 
 
 Benthesicymidae at WoRMS

Dendrobranchiata
Decapod families